Kuibysheve may refer to a number of settlements in Ukraine, named after Valerian Kuybyshev. All of them have been renamed or are to be renamed according to the law prohibiting names of Communist origin.

Urban-type settlements
 Kuibysheve, Bakhchysarai Raion, Crimea
 Kamianka, Polohy Raion, Zaporizhzhia Oblast, formerly Kuibysheve

Villages
 Kuibysheve, Yakymivka Raion, in Zaporizhzhia Oblast
 Kuibysheve, Brovary Raion, in Kyiv Oblast
 Kuibysheve, Bobrynets Raion, in Kirovohrad Oblast
 Kuibysheve, Snihurivka Raion, in Mykolaiv Oblast
 Kuibysheve, Orzhytsia Raion, in Poltava Oblast
 Kuibysheve, Shyshaky Raion, in Poltava Oblast
 Kuibysheve, Berylav Raion, in Kherson Oblast
 former name of village Maloyanysol in Donetsk Oblast before 1995

Rural settlements (Hamlets)
 Kuibysheve, Yalta, in the Autonomous Republic of Crimea
 Kuibysheve, Kherson, in Kherson Oblast

See also 
 Kuybyshevo (disambiguation), the Russian equivalent